Suppa (pron. súppa) is an Italian surname.

Variants
Suppi, Suppo.

Origins
This surname can be placed as suggested by Joseph G. Fucilla among the names that are derived from objects. In this case, the surname Suppa is derived from the Italian word "zuppa" (soup), in turn from the Gothic "suppa", which means "a slice of bread soaked", or the regional term "zuffa" which means "polenta" or "corn", resulting in turn from the Lombardic "supfa", which means "broth".

The surname is mostly found in Calabria and a high concentration of inhabitants called Suppa are located in the Province of Vibo Valentia. Its origin would be more plausible from the Greek word σούπα (soup) due to Calabria's past within Magna Graecia and influence of Greek and particularly Achaean settlements but in Greek the word is a borrowing from the French word soupe.

Celebrities

 Andrea Suppa, painter
 Bernardino Suppa, protopapas of the Cattolica dei Greci (1556-1590)
 Frank Suppa, soldier of the Lucchese crime family
 Luigi Suppa, O.P. † (1565 - 1569 deceased) Archbishop of the Archdiocese of Agrigento
 Maria Suppa, Italian artist
 Marika Suppa, Grande Fratello competitor
 Coletta Suppa, Mayor of Reggio Calabria in the fifteenth century
 Mario Suppa, Mayor of Reggio Calabria in the fifteenth century
 Michelle Suppa, Canadian actress
 Pasquale Suppa, Italian football coach and former footballer
 Pasqualino Suppa, Italian director
 Silvio Suppa, Italian writer 
 Rosa Suppa, Italian political and civil lawyer.
 Pierre Suppa, French musician and a Star Academy competitor (7th season)
 Al Suppa, hockey player

Note

External links
L'Italia dei cognomi Gens.labo.net
Dissemination of the surname SUPPA in Calabria 
Suppa on locatemyname.com

Surnames of Italian origin